The 2023 New Zealand census, took place on 7 March 2023, is the thirty-fifth national census in New Zealand. It implemented measures that aimed to increase the Census' effectiveness in response to the issues faced with the 2018 census, including supporting Māori to complete the census. It also included new questions on topics such as gender, sexual identity, and disabilities/health conditions.

Conducting the census  
The 2023 census can be completed online or on paper forms. Forms with an access code were mailed out to householders from 20 February, but paper forms can be requested online or by telephone (free call 0800 CENSUS (0800 236-787)).

This enquiry and help number has operators speaking English, te reo Māori, Samoan, Tongan, Korean, Mandarin, Cantonese, Hindi and Punjabi. New Zealand Sign Language is available through NZ Relay 

One dwelling form is required for each household, and one individual form for each person present in the dwelling on Tuesday 7 March 2023.

History 

The date for the 2023 New Zealand census was announced by Stats NZ on 28 September 2022.

References

Works cited
 

Censuses in New Zealand
2023 in New Zealand